The Stud Stable was a professional wrestling heel stable in World Championship Wrestling, Southeast Championship Wrestling and the Continental Wrestling Association.

History

Southeastern Championship Wrestling (1982–1986)
The Stud Stable was first formed by "The Original Tennessee Stud" Ron Fuller in Southeastern Championship Wrestling in 1982. His version included Fuller's cousin Jimmy Golden, a young Arn Anderson and the masked Lord Humongous (not Sid Vicious, but the original Lord Humongous). They feuded with "Mr. Olympia" Jerry Stubbs, Austin Idol and Bob Armstrong, as well as Armstrong's sons, Brad, Scott and Steve.

Continental Wrestling Association (1986–1990)
The next version was created by Ron's brother Robert Fuller in 1986. Between 1986 and 1989 in the Continental Wrestling Association, members included Fuller, Golden, Dutch Mantel, Wendell Cooley, Detroit Demolition, Tom Prichard, The Flame, Cactus Jack, Brian Lee and Gary Young. They feuded with the Armstrong family, Cooley and The Nightmares in Continental, and with Jerry Lawler and Jeff Jarrett in Memphis.

Smoky Mountain Wrestling (1991–1993)
In 1991, another version of The Stud Stable was formed in Smoky Mountain Wrestling that contained Robert Fuller, Jimmy Golden, and Dutch Mantel. The Stud Stable feuded with The Rock 'n' Roll Express and The Heavenly Bodies. They started out as pure heels, but became 'tweeners, feuding with both heels and babyfaces. The group disbanded when Robert Fuller went to WCW to become a manager in 1993.

World Championship Wrestling (1994–1996)
The final version was created in World Championship Wrestling when Robert Fuller was known as "Col. Rob Parker." He formed the stable in 1994 with Arn Anderson, Terry Funk, Golden as Bunkhouse Buck, and Meng, who was Parker's bodyguard.

This stable feuded heavily with Dusty and Dustin Rhodes until late 1994 when Funk left and was replaced by Dick Slater. They have also feuded with Brian Pillman. The Blacktop Bully was also briefly a member. In August 1995, Meng left (eventually to join the Dungeon of Doom) and Anderson went to rejoin Ric Flair and eventually reform The Four Horsemen. The Stud Stable feuded with Harlem Heat over the WCW World Tag Team Championship in which Buck and Slater won. They were also feuding because of a love/hate relationship between Parker and the Heat's manager, Sister Sherri. Parker eventually dumped Slater and Buck for Martel and the stable was broken up when Fuller left  WCW in 1997.

Major League Wrestling (2018)
In 2018,  MLW created a new version of the Stud Stable with  Col. Rob Parker managing a tag team known as The Dirty Blondes and  Jake Hager.

Members and incarnations
Continental Championship Wrestling (SCW / CCW / CWF)
Southeastern Championship Wrestling (1982–1986)
Ron Fuller (manager)
Robert Fuller
Jimmy Golden
Arn Anderson
Continental Championship Wrestling (1986–1988)
Robert Fuller
Jimmy Golden
Dutch Mantel
"Wildcat" Wendell Cooley
Detroit Demolition
Tom Prichard
The Flame
Jerry Stubbs
Continental Wrestling Federation/United States Wrestling Association (1988–1990)
Robert Fuller
Jimmy Golden
Cactus Jack
Brian Lee
"Gorgeous" Gary Young
Phil Hickerson
Brickhouse Brown
The Rock 'n' Roll RPMs
Sid Eudy
Downtown Bruno (manager)
Miss Sylvia (manager)
Smoky Mountain Wrestling (1991–1993)
Robert Fuller
Jimmy Golden
Dutch Mantel
World Championship Wrestling (1994–1996)
Colonel Robert Parker (Robert Fuller) (manager)
Meng (bodyguard) 
Bunkhouse Buck (Jimmy Golden)
Arn Anderson
"Stunning" Steve Austin
Terry Funk
Dick Slater
Barry Windham
Blacktop Bully
Kurasawa
The Mauler/Mike Enos
The Amazing French Canadians (Jacques Rougeau, Jr. and Carl Ouellet)
Major League Wrestling  (2018)
The Dirty Blondes (Michael Patrick and Leo Brien)
Mike Parrow
Jake Hager

Championships and accomplishments
Continental Wrestling Association
NWA Mid-America Heavyweight Championship (2 times) Dutch Mantel
CWA Tag Team Championship (3 times)- Cactus Jack and Gary Young (1 time) Robert Fuller and Jimmy Golden (2 times)
Southeastern Championship Wrestling
NWA Southeastern Heavyweight Championship (1 time) – Ron Fuller
NWA Southeastern Television Championship (1 time) – Robert Fuller
NWA Southeastern Tag Team Championship (7 times) – Robert Fuller and Jimmy Golden
Continental Championship Wrestling
NWA Southeastern Heavyweight Championship (Southern Division) (1 Time) – Ron Fuller
NWA Alabama Heavyweight Championship (6 times) – Wendell Cooley (3 times), Jerry Stubbs (1 time), Tom Prichard (2 times)
NWA Southeast Continental Heavyweight Championship (3 times) – Jerry Stubbs (1 time), Wendell Cooley (1 time), Dutch Mantel (1 time)
NWA Southeastern Junior Heavyweight Championship  (5 times) – Tom Prichard
NWA Southeastern Heavyweight Championship (Northern Division) (1 time) – Dutch Mantel
NWA Southeast Continental Tag Team Championship (2 times) – Robert Fuller and Jimmy Golden
Continental Wrestling Federation
NWA Southeastern United States Junior Heavyweight Championship (1 time) – Downtown Bruno
CWF Tag Team Championship (1 time) – Jimmy Golden and Brian Lee
World Championship Wrestling
WCW United States Heavyweight Championship (2 times) – Steve Austin
WCW World Television Championship (1 time) – Arn Anderson
WCW World Tag Team Championship (1 time) – Dick Slater and Bunkhouse Buck

Notes

References

American Wrestling Association teams and stables
World Championship Wrestling teams and stables
Smoky Mountain Wrestling teams and stables
Independent promotions teams and stables
Major League Wrestling teams and stables